This is a list of Universal Music Group musical artists. Bands are listed by the first letter in their name (not including the words "a", "an", or "the"), and individuals are listed by last name.

0–9 

 10cc
 10 Years
 2 Chainz
 3 Doors Down
 4minute (South Korea)
 4 Non Blondes
 4 Strings
 5 Seconds of Summer
 The 1975

A-B 

Amir Tataloo (Iran)
 A-Mei (Taiwan)
 Armored Saint
 Aaliyah
 Abandon All Ships
 ABBA
 Tiago Abravanel (Walt Disney Records)
 Pedro Abrunhosa (Portugal)
 Ace of Base
 Bryan Adams
 Admiral T
 AFI
 Afrojack
 After Midnight Project
 AGA (Hong Kong)
 Agoney
 Ahlam (UAE)
 Ai
 Airbourne
 The Airborne Toxic Event
 Aitana
 AJR
 Akon
 Yemi Alade
 Carlos Alazraqui (Walt Disney Records)
 Alesso
 All About Eve
 The All-American Rejects
 All That Remains
 All Time Low
 Gary Allan
 Allstar Weekend
 Alphabeat
 Alphaville
 Alsou
 Alter Bridge
 Amal Hijazi (Lebanon)
 Amaranthe
 America
 Amir Tataloo (Iran)
 Amr Diab (Egypt)
 Namie Amuro
 Anastacia
 Anberlin
 Angels & Airwaves
 Anggun
 Angham (Egypt)
 Paul Anka
 Tony Anselmo (Walt Disney Records)
 Anthrax
 Anthonia Edwards
 Arnaldo Antunes
 Apink (South Korea)
 Apocalyptica
 Aqua
 The Aquabats
 Guilherme Arantes
 Beni Arashiro
 Arcade Fire
 Jann Arden
 India Arie
 Army of Lovers (Sweden)
 As It Is
 Ashanti
 Ashes Divide
 Asia
 Asma Lamnawar (Morocco)
 Assala Nasri (Syria)
 Rick Astley
 Astrid S
 AC/DC
 Atreyu
 Ateez (South Korea)
 Audioslave
 August Burns Red
 Johnta Austin
 Jin Au-Yeung
 Avenged Sevenfold
 Avicii
 Ayọ
 Iggy Azalea
 Charles Aznavour
 BG
 Lil Baby
 Babyface
 Bad Meets Evil
 Erykah Badu
 Backstreet Boys
 David Banner
 David Glen Eisley
 Barei
 Barenaked Ladies (Walt Disney Records)
 Base Ball Bear
 Bastille
 Franco Battiato
 Beast (South Korea)
 Beastie Boys
 The Beatles
 Robin Beck
 Bee Gees
 Drake Bell (2006–2009)
 Kristen Bell (Walt Disney Records)
 Pat Benatar
 Benny Benassi
 Edoardo Bennato
 Eugenio Bennato
 George Benson
 Dierks Bentley
Ben Utomo (Def Jam Southeast Asia)
 Berlin
 Gael García Bernal (Walt Disney Records)
 Tiago Bettencourt (Portugal)
 Beyoncé (Walt Disney Records)
 Justin Bieber
 Big Bang (South Korea)
 Big Sean
 Big Time Rush
 Dima Bilan
 Birdman
 Jane Birkin
 David Bisbal
 Björk
 Aloe Blacc
 Dan Black
 The Black Eyed Peas
 Blackpink (South Korea)
 Black Tide
 Black Veil Brides
 Blink-182
 Blondie
 Blood Raw
 Bloodhound Gang
 Bloom 06
 The Notorious B.I.G.
 Billy Blue
 Blue
 Blue October
 Jonas Blue
 Emily Blunt (Walt Disney Records)
 James Blunt
 Andrea Bocelli
 Bohemia
 Bombay Rockers
 Black Sabbath
 Badshah (rapper)
 Bon Jovi
 Bond
 Bone Thugs-n-Harmony
 Boston
 Boys Republic (South Korea)
 Boyzone
 Bow Wow
 Brand New
 Brandy
 The Bravery
 TJ Davis (Walt Disney Records)
 Tamar Braxton
 Toni Braxton
 Breaking Benjamin
 Alicia Bridges
 Carlinhos Brown
 Divine Brown
 James Brown
 Bruno & Marrone (since 2017)
 Luke Bryan
 BtoB (South Korea)
 BTS (South Korea)
 Buckcherry
 Bullet for My Valentine
 Bun B
 Emma Bunton
 Buraka Som Sistema
 Busiswa
 Bushido
 David Bustamante
 Butthole Surfers

C-D 

Camila Cabello
 Colbie Caillat
 Camille
 Bruno Campos (Walt Disney Records)
 Caparezza
 Capital Cities
 Lewis Capaldi
 Alessia Cara
 Irene Cara
 Mariah Carey
 Belinda Carlisle (US and Canada only)
 Vanessa Carlton
 Kim Carnes
 The Carpenters
 Vikki Carr
 Brynn Cartelli
 Cascada
 Jace Chan (2019-2023)
 Johnny Cash
 Cash Cash
 Cassie
 Biquini Cavadão
 Nick Cave
 Cazuza
 Cepeda (singer) 
 Chamillionaire
 Eason Chan
 Jordan Chan
 Greyson Chance
 Keshia Chanté
 Charlee
 Charlene
 Ray Charles
 Charles and Eddie
 Sunidhi Chauhan (India)
 The Cheetah Girls (Hollywood Records/Walt Disney)
 The Chemical Brothers
 Kelly Chen (Universal Music Hong Kong)
 Chenoa
 Cher
 Cherish (Since 2006)
 Cheryl
 Jacky Cheung
 Tessanne Chin
 Children Collide
 Phil Collins (Virgin UK; Walt Disney Records)
 Chicane
 Children of Bodom
 China Crisis
 Chitãozinho & Xororó
 Chumbawamba
 Chvrches (UK only)
 Tami Chynn
 Cimorelli
 Cinema Bizarre (band)
 City Boy
 Petula Clark
 Robert Clary
 Classics IV
 Jemaine Clement (Walt Disney Records)
 Clementino (since 2013)
 Patsy Cline
 George Clinton
 Clouds
 Momoiro Clover
 Club Dogo
 Coal Chamber
 Joe Cocker
 Coldplay (former)
 Keyshia Cole
 Jacob Collier
 Common
 Jennifer Connelly (Eastworld)
 Bradley Cooper
 Easton Corbin
 Chris Cornell
 Corson
 Counting Crows
 Clique Girlz
 Crashdïet
 Ciara
 CPM 22
 The Cranberries
 Auliʻi Cravalho (Walt Disney Records)
 Crazy Frog
 Crazy Town
 Creamy
 The Cross
 Taio Cruz
 Crystal Castles
 The Crystal Method
 Culture Club
 The Cure
 Curren$y
 Cut Copy
 Miley Cyrus
 D12
 DaBaby
 Da Mouth
 Daddy Yankee
 Dancemania
 Elhaida Dani
 Danzig
 Dark Tranquility
 Tiffany Darwish
 Chris Daughtry
 Craig David
 Keith David (Walt Disney Records)
 Darude
 Days Difference
 Dead by April
 Dave Matthews Band
 Deadmau5
 Death (Canada)
 Dean (South Korea)
 Deep Purple
 Def Leppard
 Emmelie de Forest
 Lana Del Rey
 DeLon
 Kat DeLuna
 Mao Denda
 Depeche Mode
 Desiigner
 Device
 Diamond Platnumz 
 Dido
 Die Antwoord
 Celine Dion (Walt Disney Records)
 Dire Straits
 Dirty Vegas
 Aura Dione
 Divine
 Carlos do Carmo
 DJ Snake
 DMX
 DNCE
 Doda
 Doro
 Double You
 The-Dream
 Dreams Come True (Since 1997)
 DragonForce (Finland)
 Dragonette
 Drake
 Dr. Dre
 The Drums
 Duck Sauce
 Duffy
 Dulce Maria
 Duke Dumont
 Josh Dun
 Zélia Duncan (1998–2012)
 Duran Duran (North America)
 Jason Dy (Philippines)
 Dzeko
 Claudio Wade (Universal Music South Africa)

E-F 

 The Eagles
 Kate Earl
 Sheena Easton
 Eels
 Taron Egerton
 Eiffel 65
 Billie Eilish
 Chiwetel Ejiofor (Walt Disney Records)
 Mikky Ekko
 Cássia Eller
 Yvonne Elliman
 Eloy
 Eminem
 Enhypen
 Paul Engemann
 Enigma
 Enca 
 Enya (Geffen Records)
 Emma's Imagination
 Empire of the Sun
 Enter Shikari
 Equinox (Bulgaria)
 Sully Erna
 Escape the Fate
 Darren Espanto (Philippines)
 Estelle
 Melissa Etheridge
 Evanescence
 Mark Oliver Everett
 Exodus
 Fabolous
 Faithless
 Fall Out Boy
 FanFan
 Far East Movement
 Mylène Farmer
 Fazura (Universal Music Malaysia)
 Felli Fel
 Fergie
 Paula Fernandes
 Tiziano Ferro (Italy)
 Fever Ray
 The Fevers
 Fabri Fibra
 Shane Filan
 Finger Eleven
 Melanie Fiona
 Helene Fischer (Germany)
 Fisherman's Friends
 Five for Fighting (Walt Disney Records)
 Flaw
 The Fleetwoods
 Flipsyde
 Florence and the Machine
 David Fonseca
 Forever the Sickest Kids
 Lita Ford
 Frankie Goes to Hollywood
 Chester French
 Fresno (2008–2010)
 Mel Fronckowiak
 Fugees
 Masaharu Fukuyama
 Nelly Furtado

G-H 

 Josh Gad (Walt Disney Records)
 Gal Gadot (Walt Disney Records)
 Lady Gaga
 Polina Gagarina
 Serge Gainsbourg
 Green Day
 Lyca Gairanod (Philippines)
 Sakura Gakuin
 The Game
 Melody Gardot
 Art Garfunkel
 Sean Garrett
 Martin Garrix
 Manu Gavassi
 Crystal Gayle (United Artists/Capitol/Liberty)
 Cedric Gervais
 Ghostface Killah
 Vince Gill
 Kendji Girac
 Girlicious
 Girls' Generation (South Korea)
 Glass Animals
 Donald Glover (Walt Disney Records)
 Go Back to the Zoo
 Go_A (Ukrainian band)
 Sergio Godinho (Portugal)
 Godsmack
 The Go-Go's
 Selena Gomez
 Anthony Gonzales (Walt Disney Records)
 Lesley Gore
 Gorillaz
 Gotye
 Ellie Goulding
 The Graces
 Josh Gracin
 Ariana Grande
 Amy Grant
 Gravitonas (Sweden)
 Conan Gray
 David Gray
 Loren Gray
 Great White
 Skylar Grey (since 2004)
 Christina Grimmie
 Jonathan Groff (Walt Disney Records)
 Bai Guang
 Ana Guerra (Spain)
 Juan Luis Guerra
 David Guetta (former)
 Guns N' Roses
 Cory Gunz
 GZA
 Haddaway
 Halsey
 Charles Hamilton
 Jan Hammer
 Jay Hardway
 George Harrison
 Debbie Harry
 Yū Hayami
 Asuca Hayashi
 Megumi Hayashibara
 Isaac Hayes
 Joe Hisaishi
 Heart
 Hedley
 Hellogoodbye
 Hide
 Keri Hilson
 HIM
 Hinder
 Aya Hirano
 Amy Holland
 Eddie Holland
 Buddy Holly
 Hollywood Monsters (Canada)
 Hollywood Undead
 Rupert Holmes
 Minako Honda
 Bai Hong
 Hoobastank
 Ace Hood
 Mallary Hope
 Hot Rod
 Hot Chelle Rae
 Tomoyasu Hotei
 Hozier
 Mr Hudson
 The Human League
 Hyper Crush

I-J 

 I Blame Coco
 I Mother Earth
 I Prevail
 Il Volo
 Ice Nine Kills
 Icehouse
 Ida Maria
 Ikke Nurjanah (Indonesia)
 Enrique Iglesias
 Ilegales
 Ilya
 Imagine Dragons
 Miki Imai
 IMx
 In Dread Response
 Inna
 Incubus
 Infected Mushroom
 Inner Circle
 Infinite (South Korea)
 Institute
 Iron Maiden
 Ironik
 Tajja Isen
 IU (South Korea)
 IZ*ONE (South Korea)
 Iza (Walt Disney Records)
 Michael Jackson (1964–1974)
 The Jackson 5 (1964–1974)
 Jacquees
 Jada
 Jadakiss
 Jadyn Maria
 Jay-Z
 Ja Rule
 Jean-Michel Jarre
 Wyclef Jean
 Jedward
 Jeezy
 Carly Rae Jepsen
 Jeremih
 Jack Jersey
 Gloria Jessica (Indonesia)
 Jessie J
 Jessie James
 Elton John
 Dwayne Johnson (Walt Disney Records)
 Jack Johnson
 Marv Johnson
 Michael Johnson
 Jonas Brothers
 Joe Jonas
 Jovanotti
 Juanes
 Juice WRLD

K-L 

 Kadim Al Sahir (Iraq and Morocco)
 Kuana Torres Kahele
 Israel Kamakawiwoʻole
 Karkadan
 Katrina and the Waves
 Crystal Kay
 Kelis
 Claude Kelly
 Tori Kelly
 DJ Khaled
 Wiz Khalifa (Rostrum Records)
 Kid Abelha (Since 2000)
 Kid Cudi
 Kidz Bop Kids
 The Killers
 Natalia Kills
 Lil' Kim
 Kiss
 K.I.Z
 The Knife
 Kristian Kostov
 Kaori Kozai
 KR$NA (India)
 Alison Krauss
 George Lam
 Gin Lee (Universal Music Hong Kong)
 La Roux
 Juan Karlos Labajo (Philippines)
 Lady A
 Ladyhawke
 Natalia Lafourcade (Walt Disney Records)
 Laleh
 Sandy Lam
 Kendrick Lamar
 Kep1er (South Korea) 
 La Materialista
 Elettra Lamborghini
 Bishop Lamont
 Yves Larock
 Latifa (Tunisia)
 Latino
 Lawson
 Lebo M. (Walt Disney Records)
 Swae Lee
 John Lennon
 Fish Leong
 Nolwenn Leroy (France)
 Donna Lewis
 Prudence Liew
 Lifer
 Lights
 Lil Ru
 Lim Hyung Joo
 Limp Bizkit
 Little River Band
 Cher Lloyd
 LMFAO
 Tove Lo
 Lobão
 Lobo
 Logic
 The Lonely Island
 Jennifer Lopez
 Pablo Lopez
 T Lopez
 Lorde
 Loona (Universal Music Japan)
 Pixie Lott
 Demi Lovato
 Lucenzo
 Ludo
 Ludacris
 The Lumineers
 Luna Sea
 Ross Lynch
 Lyodra Ginting (Indonesia)

M-N 

 Mabel
 Seth MacFarlane
 Mary MacGregor
 Mack 10
 Madonna (Since 2010)
 Kaitlyn Maher
 Mahmood (singer)
 Mack Maine
 The Maine
 Majid Al Mohandis (Rotana Records)
 Yngwie Malmsteen
 Glasses Malone
 Post Malone
 Marilyn Manson
 Mamonas Assassinas
 Mandisa
 Mannie Fresh
 Marcelo D2
 Marcus & Martinus
 Marky
 Maria Isabel
 Bob Marley
 Maroon 5
 Marracash
 Marshmello
 Jessica Mauboy
 Dean Martin
 The Marvelettes
 Richard Marx
 Massacration
 Masta Killa
 Takako Matsu
 Seiko Matsuda
 Yumi Matsutoya
 Yasuko Matsuyuki
 John Mayer
 Paul McCartney
 JD McCrary
 Reba McEntire
 Bobby McFerrin
 Maureen McGovern
 Tim McGraw
 Kevin McHale
 Don McLean
 Katharine McPhee
 Meat Loaf
 Megadeth
 John Mellencamp
 Shawn Mendes
 Roi Méndez
 Bridgit Mendler
 Idina Menzel (Walt Disney Records)
 Daniel Merriweather
 Metallica
 Metal Church
 Method Man
 Lena Meyer-Landrut
 MIA
 Michael Learns to Rock (Virgin Records)
 Julia Michaels (Republic)
 Chrisette Michelle
 Migos
 Miguel (Geffen Records/Walt Disney)
 Mihimaru GT
 Mika
 Christina Milian
 Jae Millz
 Nicki Minaj
 Lin-Manuel Miranda (Walt Disney Records)
 Miyavi
 Mishlawi (Germany)
 Miss A (Since 2012)
 Mohamed Hamaki (Egypt)
 Karen Mok (Hong Kong, China)
 Zascha Moktan
 Moneybagg Yo
 Monsta X (South Korea)
 Monster Magnet
 French Montana
 Calliope Mori
 Giorgio Moroder
 James Morrison
 Ryoko Moriyama
 Lil Mosey
 Mohamed Mounir
 Ana Moura (Portugal)
 George Michael
 Nana Mouskouri
 Mumford & Sons
 Anne Murray
 Muse
 Kacey Musgraves
 Mushroomhead
 Mýa
 Billie Myers
 David Nail
 Nadia Nakai (South Africa)
 The Naked and Famous
 Naked Eyes (US and Canada only)
 Ariel Nan
 Nancy Ajram (Lebanon)
 Gianna Nannini
 Nas
 Milton Nascimento
 Nasty C (South Africa)
 Nate Dogg
 Nav
 Nawal El Zoghbi (Rotana Records)
 NCT 127
 N-Dubz
 Ne-Yo
 Nelly
 Jesy Nelson
 N.E.R.D
 Randy Newman
 Olivia Newton-John (US and Canada)
 Nickelback (Canada)
 Night Ranger
 Nightwish
 Nimo (Germany)
 Alice Nine
 Nine Inch Nails
 Nirvana
 NOFX
 Noize MC (2006–2008)
 Noizy (Albania)
 Willy Northpole
 Terri Nunn
 N.W.A.
 NX Zero (2006–2012)
 Cassper Nyovest

O–P 

 Colby O'Donis
 Dolores O'Riordan
 OCTPATH (Japan)
 Kardinal Offishall
 Ol' Dirty Bastard
 Don Omar
 Of Monsters and Men
 Oh Wonder
 Oingo Boingo
 Chiyo Okumura
 OneRepublic
 Yoko Ono
 Oomph!
 Orianthi
 Olivia Rodrigo (Interscope Geffen A&M)
 Johnny Orlando
 Emily Osment
 The Offspring (Reissue)
 The Outfield (1990–1992)
 Owl City
 O-Town (A&M Records, Japan/Germany/France)
 Electric Banana Band
 Kenji Ozawa
 P.O.D.
 Will Pan (Taiwan)
 Papa Roach
 Elena Paparizou (Greece)
 Eric Papilaya (Austria)
 The Parlotones
 Tina Parol (Walt Disney Records)
 Dolly Parton
 Morteza Pashaei
 Sean Paul
 Rob Paulsen (Walt Disney Records)
 Belinda Peregrín
 Katy Perry
 P1X3L (HK) (2021-)
 P1Harmony (South Korea) 
 Pet Shop Boys (US and Canada)
 Peter Bjorn and John
 Pierce the Veil
 Perfume
 Phantogram
 Phantom Blue
 Pink Floyd
 The Platters
 Play
 Playaz Circle
 Poeta Callejero
 The Police (US only)
 Cassadee Pope
 Mike Posner
 Denez Prigent
 The Pussycat Dolls
 Push Baby
 Parachute
 The Presets
 Prima J
 Jamie Principle
 The Pursuit of Happiness (Canada)
 PSY (since 2012, South Korea)

Q–T 

 Gong Qiuxia
 Wanting Qu
 Queen (since 2011)
 Queens of the Stone Age
 Queensrÿche
 R5
 Ra
 Radwimps
 A. R. Rahman
 Rainbow (South Korea)
 Rainer + Grimm
 Eros Ramazzotti
 Rammstein
 Dizzee Rascal
 Ramones (Chrysalis Records)
 Raven-Symoné
 Razorlight
 Rebeldes (EMI Music Brazil/Record Entertenimento)
 Redman
 Red Hot Chili Peppers (1983–1990)
 Trippie Redd
 Helen Reddy
 Rev Theory
 Lana Del Rey
 Dan Reynolds
 Busta Rhymes
 Rich Boy
 Lionel Richie
 Flo Rida
 Rihanna
 Rise Against
 Tyson Ritter
 Johnny Rivers
 Nicola Roberts
 Robyn
 Rocko
 Kenny Rogers
 The Rolling Stones
 Amaia Romero
 Rooney
 Tono Rosario
 Diana Ross
 Rick Ross
 Asher Roth
 Royce da 5'9"
 Sakis Rouvas (Greece)
 RPM
 Rubber Soul
 Paulina Rubio (2000-2020)
 Kevin Rudolf
 The Runaways
 Brenda Russell
 Renato Russo
 Alexander Rybak
 Serena Ryder

 Baba Saad
 Stray Kids
 Sagarika
 Saber Rebaï (Rotana Records)
 Kyu Sakamoto
 Mark Salling
 Samved (India)
 Marta Sánchez
 Jessica Sanchez
 Sandy
 Sandy & Júnior
 Ivete Sangalo
 Juelz Santana
 Lulu Santos
 Nico Santos
 Michael Sarver
 Joe Satriani
 The Saturdays
 Satyricon
 Tiwa Savage (Nigeria)
 Saving Grace
 Nicole Scherzinger
 Scooter
 Scorpions
 Lil Scrappy
 Jay Sean
 Seeb
 Seether
 Raul Seixas
 Serebro (Worldwide/Japan)
 Karol Sevilla (Walt Disney Records)
 Shaan
 Shaggy
 Gaston (Universal Music Publishing)
 Tupac Shakur
 Shareefa
 Shatha Hassoun (Morocco and Iraq)
 Ringo Sheena
 Ashton Shepherd
 Rabbi Shergill
 Sherine (Rotana Records)
 SHINee (South Korea)
 Shontelle
 Show-Ya (Eastworld, Japan)
 Sia
 Sigma
 Krista Siegfrids (Finland)
 Sigrid
 Silentó
 Sarah Silverman (Walt Disney Records)
 Ashlee Simpson
 Jessica Simpson
 Frank Sinatra
 Bob Sinclar
 Sister Soleil
 Simone & Simaria (Since 2015)
 Simple Minds
 Simple Plan (Lava Records)
 Siti Nurhaliza (Universal Music Malaysia)
 Troye Sivan
 Smile.dk
 Slash
 Slayer
 Slick Rick
 Smash Mouth
 Dan Smith
 Faryl Smith
 Sam Smith
 Patty Smyth
 Snoop Dogg
 Snow Patrol
 Sodagreen (Taiwan)
 Sauti Sol (Kenya)
 Stella Soleil
 Dtidrik Solli-Tangenh
 Martin Solveig
 Jeon So-mi (South Korea)
 Sonata Arctica
 Luísa Sonza (Walt Disney Records)
 Soraya
 Takashi Sorimachi
 Soulja Boy
 Spandau Ballet
 Dusty Springfield
 Sugarland
 Space Cowboy
 Spice Girls
 Spose
 Rae Sremmurd
 Vince Staples
 Chris Stapleton
 Ringo Starr
 STAYC (South Korea)
 Sting
 Street Drum Corps
 Steel Panther
 Gwen Stefani
 Hailee Steinfeld
 Rod Stewart
 George Strait
 Stromae
 Barrett Strong
 Tinchy Stryder
 Stryper
 The Stunners
 Sum 41
 Stefanie Sun
 Chay Suede
 Donna Summer
 Super Junior (South Korea)
 Super Monkey's
 Supertramp
 Surfaces
 Svoy
 Taylor Swift
 SZA
 t.A.T.u.
 T-ara (South Korea)
 Junnosuke Taguchi
 Yukihiro Takahashi
 Take That
 Alan Tam
 Nami Tamaki
 Tamta (Greece)
 Eriko Tamura
 Tarja
 Tataloo
 Amir Tataloo
 Teyana Taylor
 Tears for Fears
 Ryan Tedder
 Teresa Teng (Japan only)
 Thirty Seconds to Mars
 Tiara Andini (Indonesia)
 Tiësto
 Tihuana
 TM88
 Tokio Hotel
 Tom Tom Club
 Rie Tomosaka
 Toquinho
 T'Pau
 The Tragically Hip
 The Rose (South Korea)
 Malu Trevejo
 Testament (Spitfire)
 Treat
 Neon Trees
 Gloria Trevi
 TripleS (South Korea) 
 Tri.be (South Korea)
 Ms. Triniti
 Josh Turner
 TV on the Radio
 Shania Twain
 Twelve Girls Band
 TWICE (South Korea)
 Lil Twist
 Conway Twitty
 TXT (South Korea)
 Tyga
 TYP

U-V 

 Gaston
 U-God
 Ultrabeat
 Carrie Underwood
 Unladylike
 Keith Urban
 Legião Urbana
 Hikaru Utada
 Vacca
 The Vamps
 Armin van Buuren
 Sepultura
 Vangelis
 Van Halen
 Virginia to Vegas
 The Veer Union
 Venom
 Vitamin Z
 Vixen
 Volbeat

W-X 

 Wale
 Sebastian Walldén
 Joe Walsh
 Cyndi Wang
 Wang Chung
 The Wanted
 WaT
 Lil Wayne
 The Weeknd
 Weezer
 Jannine Weigel (Thailand)
 Florence Welch
 Ye (rapper)
 Weiland
 Westlife
 Eric Whitacre
 Barry White
 Whitesnake (US and Canada)
 The Who
 Jane Wiedlin
 The Wiggles (Australia)
 Kim Wilde
 Wisin & Yandel
 Wolfmother
 Lee Ann Womack
 Stevie Wonder
 Holly Williams
 Robbie Williams
 Vanessa Williams
 will.i.am
 Wilson Phillips
 Amy Winehouse
 Steve Winwood
 Within Temptation
 Wonder Girls (South Korea)
 Joe Wong
 Evan Rachel Wood (Walt Disney Records)
 Wu Bai
 Fang Wu
 Kris Wu
 Vanilla Ice
 Vanness Wu
 Wu Yingyin
 Babi Xavier
 Xikers (South Korea) 
 Xonia
 U2
 Motörhead
 Xuxa

Y-Z 

 Yao Lee
 Lil Yachty
 Yoshiko Yamaguchi
 Yazz
 Yeah Yeah Yeahs
 Years & Years
 Yelle
 Yellow Magic Orchestra
 Yohio
 Your Favorite Martian
 Saori Yuki
 Yung L.A.
 Maher Zain (Rotana Records)
 Zendaya
 Zhou Xuan
 Joana Zimmer
 Rob Zombie
 Zucchero
 Yung Shizzle
 Zubeen Garg

List of artists on UMLE
This is a list of artist currently signed to Universal Music Latin Entertainment.

List of former artists on UMLE
These are artists who were formerly signed on to either Universal Music Latin Entertainment or Universal Music Latino.

References 

Universal Music Group
Universal Music Group